103rd Brigade may refer to:

 103rd Separate Guards Airborne Brigade (Russia)
  (Republican Spain)
 103rd Separate Territorial Defense Brigade (Ukraine)
 103rd (Suffolk) Brigade, Royal Field Artillery (United Kingdom)
103rd (Tyneside Irish) Brigade (United Kingdom)
 103rd Field Artillery Brigade (United States)

See also
 103rd Division
 103rd Regiment

sl:Seznam brigad po zaporednih številkah (100. - 149.)#103. brigada